Ojamajo Doremi Na-i-sho is an original video animation series created by Toei Animation in 2004. It focuses on elementary school students who become witch apprentices. Led by Doremi Harukaze, the girls must maintain their double lives in secret. Despite being aired after its fourth season, this season is taken place during its  third season.

Episode list

See also

2004 Japanese television series debuts
2004 Japanese television series endings
Ojamajo Doremi episode lists
Ojamajo Doremi series